Shi Yi Liu, known professionally as Eric Reprid, is a Canadian independent rapper and songwriter based in Vancouver. His 2020 single "Cold World" reached 24 million plays and was nominated for Rap Recording of the Year at the Juno Awards of 2021; he was the only independent nominated in that category.

Awards and nominations

References 

Living people
Canadian male rappers
Canadian musicians of Asian descent
Musicians from Vancouver
21st-century Canadian male musicians
21st-century Canadian rappers
Year of birth missing (living people)